SURC may refer to:
 Small unit riverine craft
 Swansea University Rowing Club
Southampton University Road Cycling